Rob Lever is an English rugby league footballer who plays for the Swinton Lions in the Championship. His playing position is Loose Forward.

Wigan
Lever played for Wigan at Under-19s level and was young player of the year in 2013 but failed to break into the club's first team set up. Lever made 3 appearances for England Academy playing Loose forward.

Workington Town
He was dual registered with Workington Town in the Championship and played four times for the club.

Swinton
Lever played on loan in 2015 and was awarded young player of the year and is playing for Swinton in 2016, having signed a one-year contract with the newly promoted Championship club. Lever has resigned to continue into the 2017 season.

References

External links

Wigan Warriors profile

1995 births
Living people
English rugby league players
Rugby league props
Rugby league locks
South Wales Scorpions players
Swinton Lions players
Wigan Warriors players
Workington Town players